Another Workout is an album by jazz tenor saxophonist Hank Mobley recorded during two sessions in 1961. Most of the album was recorded during a session on December 5, 1961, while the final track, "Three Coins in a Fountain," was recorded on March 26, 1961 (during the sessions for Mobley's Workout album). The album was first released on the Blue Note label in 1985. The musicians on Another Workout are the same as those on Workout, with the exception of guitarist Grant Green, who does not appear on Another Workout. The musicians are: Mobley, pianist Wynton Kelly, bassist Paul Chambers, and drummer Philly Joe Jones.

Track listing 
All compositions by Hank Mobley, except where noted.

 "Out of Joe's Bag" - 5:07
 "I Should Care" (Cahn, Stordahl, Weston) - 7:41
 "Gettin' and Jettin'" - 7:43
 "Hank's Other Soul" - 8:42
 "Hello Young Lovers" (Hammerstein, Rodgers) - 8:03
 "Three Coins in a Fountain" (Styne, Cahn) - 5:33 Not featured on the 2006 RVG edition, but included on Workout

Personnel 
 Hank Mobley - tenor saxophone
 Wynton Kelly - piano
 Paul Chambers - bass
 Philly Joe Jones - drums

References

1985 albums
Albums produced by Alfred Lion
Blue Note Records albums
Hank Mobley albums
Albums recorded at Van Gelder Studio